Diphenylcyclopropenone (diphencyprone) is a topically administered experimental drug intended for treating alopecia areata and alopecia totalis. Topical immunotherapy using diphenylcyclopropenone may also be an effective treatment option for recalcitrant warts.  It is not approved by either the Food and Drug Administration or the European Medicines Agency.

Mechanism of action
Diphenylcyclopropenone triggers an immune response that is thought to oppose the action of the autoreactive cells that otherwise cause hair loss. One hypothesis is that in response to DPCP treatment, the body will attempt to downregulate inflammation through a variety of pathways, resulting in a downregulation of the autoimmune response at the hair follicle. This autoinflammatory reaction would otherwise destroy body's hair follicles.

Studies
A study of 41 alopecia areata patients showed significant hair regrowth in 40% at 6 months, being sustained in two thirds of these after a 12-month-follow up-period.

In a 2002 study for the treatment of warts, the responders consisted of 135 individuals (87.7%) that had complete clearance of warts. Reported adverse effects were local and included with pruritus (itching) (15.6%), with blistering (7.1%), and with eczematous reactions (eczema)(14.2%). The majority of the patients tolerated the treatment very well. One patient developed local impetigo (minor infection). Patients had an average of 5 treatments over a 6-month period.

Chemical properties 
The chemical properties of diphenylcyclopropenone are dominated by the strong polarization of the carbonyl group, which gives a partial positive charge with aromatic stabilization on the cyclopropene ring and a partial negative charge on oxygen. Furthermore, the phenyl groups stabilize the partial positive charge in the ring through resonance.

Diphenylcyclopropenone reacts with electrophilic chlorinating agents, including oxalyl chloride, thionyl chloride and phosphorus pentachloride, to give 3,3-dichloro-1,2-diphenylcyclopropene, which is a reagent for the activation of carboxylic acids.

See also 
 Benzophenone
 Cyclopropenone

References 

Dermatologic drugs
Ketones
Cyclopropenes
Phenyl compounds